Mahdi Abdul-Rahman (born Walter Raphael Hazzard Jr.; April 15, 1942 – November 18, 2011) was an American professional basketball player and college basketball coach. He played in college for the UCLA Bruins and was a member of their first national championship team in 1964. He also won a gold medal that year with the US national team at the 1964 Summer Olympics. Hazzard began his pro career in the National Basketball Association (NBA) with the Los Angeles Lakers, who selected him a territorial pick in the 1964 NBA draft. He was named an NBA All-Star with the Seattle SuperSonics in 1968. After his playing career ended, he was the head coach at UCLA during the 1980s.

College career

Hazzard attended Overbrook High School in Philadelphia, where his teams went 89–3 and he was named the city's player of the year when he was a senior. Hazzard then went on to the University of California, Los Angeles, where he became a key player on the Bruins varsity basketball team. In Hazzard's first season on the varsity squad, UCLA made their first Final Four appearance in the 1962 NCAA tournament. They lost 72–70 to eventual champion Cincinnati in the semi-finals.

UCLA's first undefeated season in 1963–64 was in no small part due to Hazzard, his backcourt partner Gail Goodrich, and coach John Wooden. The team won its first NCAA Championship, and Hazzard was selected by the Associated Press as the tournament's Most Valuable Player. Following UCLA's victory in the 1964 tournament, Sports Illustrated featured a cover photograph of Walt Hazzard dribbling the basketball up court and the headline, "UCLA Is The Champ. Walt Hazzard Drives Through Duke." Hazzard was chosen as an All-American and also selected as College Player of the Year by the United States Basketball Writers Association (USBWA). His number 42 jersey was retired by UCLA in 1996 in Pauley Pavilion, but Hazzard gave his permission for stand-out recruit Kevin Love to wear the number.

Hazzard and Bill Bradley earned a spot on the 1964 Olympic basketball team for the U.S., which unsurprisingly won the gold medal. He was pre-draft territorial pick in 1964 by the Los Angeles Lakers.

NBA career
Hazzard later played in the NBA, first with the Los Angeles Lakers from 1964–1967, then the Seattle SuperSonics, the Atlanta Hawks, the Buffalo Braves, and briefly for the Golden State Warriors. He returned to the SuperSonics for the 1973–74 season, after which he retired from professional basketball.

While playing for the SuperSonics in their inaugural 1967–68 season, Hazzard scored a career high 24.0 points per game, averaged 6.2 assists per game, and was selected to play in the 1968 NBA All-Star Game. Seattle traded him to the Hawks during the off-season for Lenny Wilkens. Hazzard's career-high average in assists came during the 1969–70 season, when he averaged 6.8 assists per game while playing for the Hawks.

Coaching career
In 1980, Hazzard took a part-time position paying $1,500 annually to be the head coach at Compton Community College. He compiled a 53–9 record in his two seasons, but 21 wins from the first season were later forfeited because he used an ineligible player. According to Hazzard, poor records from the season before his arrival failed to note that the ineligible player had played that season. He went on to Division II school Chapman College, where he coach two seasons with a 44–14 record.

In 1984, he returned to UCLA as its men's basketball coach, twenty years after winning the national championship as a player. That same year, he was inducted into the UCLA Athletics Hall of Fame. He coached for four seasons, winning 77 out of 125 games. The 1984–85 UCLA Bruins basketball team won the NIT championship. The 1986–87 Bruins won both the Pac-10 regular season championship as well as the inaugural Pac-10 tournament. However, after the 1987–88 Bruins finished only two games above .500—the closest they had come to a losing record in 40 years—Hazzard was fired.

He later spent a number of years working for the Los Angeles Lakers, first as an advance scout on the west coast and later as a special consultant.

Career statistics

Playing statistics

Regular season

|-
| style="text-align:left;"| 
| style="text-align:left;"| Los Angeles
| 66 || – || 13.9 || .382 || – || .648 || 1.7 || 2.1 || – || – || 4.2
|-
| style="text-align:left;"| 
| style="text-align:left;"| Los Angeles
| 80 || – || 27.5 || .457 || – || .708 || 2.7 || 4.9 || – || – || 13.7
|-
| style="text-align:left;"| 
| style="text-align:left;"| Los Angeles
| 79 || – || 20.8 || .426 || – || .729 || 2.9 || 4.1 || – || – || 9.3
|-
| style="text-align:left;"| 
| style="text-align:left;"| Seattle
| 79 || – || 33.7 || .441 || – || .774 || 4.2 || 6.2 || – || – || 24.0
|-
| style="text-align:left;"| 
| style="text-align:left;"| Atlanta
| 80 || – || 30.3 || .397 || – || .707 || 3.3 || 5.9 || – || – || 11.2
|-
| style="text-align:left;"| 
| style="text-align:left;"| Atlanta
| 82 || – || 33.6 || .467 || – || .809 || 4.0 || 6.8 || – || – || 15.3
|-
| style="text-align:left;"| 
| style="text-align:left;"| Atlanta
| 82 || – || 35.1 || .459 || – || .759 || 3.7 || 6.3 || – || – || 16.5
|-
| style="text-align:left;"| 
| style="text-align:left;"| Buffalo
| 72 || – || 33.2 || .451 || – || .782 || 3.0 || 5.6 || – || – || 15.8
|-
| style="text-align:left;"| 
| style="text-align:left;"| Buffalo
| 9 || – || 14.9 || .417 || – || .500 || 1.1 || 1.9 || – || – || 5.9
|-
| style="text-align:left;"| 
| style="text-align:left;"| Golden State
| 46 || – || 13.7 || .418 || – || .863 || 1.7 || 2.4 || – || – || 4.5
|-
| style="text-align:left;"| 
| style="text-align:left;"| Seattle
| 49 || – || 11.7 || .422 || – || .756 || 1.2 || 2.5 || .5 || .1 || 3.8
|- class="sortbottom"
| style="text-align:center;" colspan="2"| Career
| 724 || – || 26.5 || .441 || – || .757 || 3.0 || 4.9 || .5 || .1 || 12.6

Playoffs

|-
| style="text-align:left;"| 1965
| style="text-align:left;"| Los Angeles
| 7 || – || 16.9 || .333 || – || .750 || 2.6 || 4.3 || – || – || 7.6
|-
| style="text-align:left;"| 1966
| style="text-align:left;"| Los Angeles
| 14 || – || 24.3 || .493 || – || .619 || 2.9 || 3.1 || – || – || 11.9
|-
| style="text-align:left;"| 1967
| style="text-align:left;"| Los Angeles
| 3 || – || 28.7 || .240 || – || .800 || 2.7 || 5.3 || – || – || 6.7
|-
| style="text-align:left;"| 1969
| style="text-align:left;"| Atlanta
| 11 || – || 32.7 || .393 || – || .787 || 3.0 || 3.9 || – || – || 14.0
|-
| style="text-align:left;"| 1970
| style="text-align:left;"| Atlanta
| 7 || – || 36.4 || .500 || – || .625 || 3.4 || 7.7 || – || – || 21.4
|-
| style="text-align:left;"| 1971
| style="text-align:left;"| Atlanta
| 5 || – || 40.4 || .329 || – || .800 || 5.0 || 5.4 || – || – || 14.0
|-
| style="text-align:left;"| 1973
| style="text-align:left;"| Golden State
| 11 || – || 19.5 || .357 || – || 1.000 || 1.8 || 2.5 || – || – || 6.5
|- class="sortbottom"
| style="text-align:center;" colspan="2"| Career
| 58 || – || 27.2 || .413 || – || .738 || 2.9 || 4.2 || – || – || 11.8

Coaching statistics

Personal life and death
In the summer of 1972, Hazzard embraced Islam, and started going by the name "Mahdi Abdul-Rahman" in 1972–73, his eighth season in the NBA. In 1976–77, he returned to study at UCLA, completing his degree in kinesiology at age 35. By 1980 when he joined Compton, he changed his name to Abdul-Rahman Hazzard. One of the reasons he cited was the recognition of the name Hazzard. He felt that the name change was poorly received in basketball circles, believing that it cost him opportunities, both during and after his playing career. Although he remained a Muslim, he chose to return to using his original name professionally. In 1984, UCLA introduced him as Walt Hazzard when they hired him as their coach.

Hazzard and his wife Jaleesa had four children: Yakub, Jalal, Rasheed, and Khalil, the latter being a record producer, well known in hip hop circles by the stage name DJ Khalil. Hazzard's grandsons, Jacob and Max Hazzard, also play basketball. Jacob is a former walk-on basketball player at Arizona, and Max played basketball for UC Irvine and Arizona.

On March 22, 1996, Hazzard was hospitalized following a stroke. Although he made a substantial recovery over the ensuing years, his health never returned in full and subsequent to his illness he was much less active in the public sphere. Shortly after the stroke, Lakers owner Jerry Buss promised Hazzard's family that he would remain on the team's payroll as long as Buss owned the team; Hazzard remained a Lakers employee for the rest of his life. By the middle of 2011, his health had deteriorated significantly and he was hospitalized in intensive care. On November 18 of that year, Hazzard died at the UCLA Ronald Reagan Medical Center due to complications following heart surgery. He was 69. Walt Hazzard is interred in the Muslim section at Rose Hills Memorial Park in Los Angeles.

References

www.uclabruins.com UCLA Men's Basketball Media Guide

External links

 

1942 births
2011 deaths
African-American basketball coaches
African-American basketball players
African-American Muslims
All-American college men's basketball players
American men's basketball coaches
American men's basketball players
Atlanta Hawks players
Basketball players at the 1964 Summer Olympics
Basketball coaches from Delaware
Basketball coaches from Pennsylvania
Basketball players from Wilmington, Delaware
Basketball players from Philadelphia
Burials at Rose Hills Memorial Park
Buffalo Braves players
Chapman Panthers men's basketball coaches
College men's basketball head coaches in the United States
Converts to Islam
Golden State Warriors players
Los Angeles Lakers draft picks
Los Angeles Lakers players
Medalists at the 1964 Summer Olympics
National Basketball Association All-Stars
Olympic gold medalists for the United States in basketball
Point guards
Seattle SuperSonics expansion draft picks
Seattle SuperSonics players
Shooting guards
UCLA Bruins men's basketball coaches
UCLA Bruins men's basketball players
United States men's national basketball team players
20th-century African-American sportspeople
21st-century African-American people